Joseph Abu Fadel (Arabic: جوزيف أبو فاضل) is a Lebanese journalist, political analyst and lawyer. He wrote extensively about the political situation in the Middle-East and the relationship with Israel. He is an outspoken supporter of the Syrian regime, and the Free Patriotic Movement of which he later split. He had physically assaulted a Syrian opposition activist on Al-Jazeera TV shows Al-Ittijah Al-Mu'akis on January 31, 2012.

References 

1960 births
Living people
Lebanese Christians
Lebanese lawyers
Lebanese journalists